Ceratrichia lewisi,commonly known as the Obudu forest sylph, is a species of butterfly in the family Hesperiidae. It is found in Nigeria (the Obudu Plateau). The habitat consists of forests.

References

Endemic fauna of Nigeria
Butterflies described in 2000
Hesperiinae